The 1998 Premier Development Soccer League season was the 4th PDSL season. The season began in April 1998 and ended in August 1998.

San Gabriel Valley Highlanders won the championship, defeating the Jackson Chargers 3–2.  Jackson won the regular season title, winning all 16 games and posting a whopping +84 goal difference.  Four teams from the Pacific Coast Soccer League joined as associate members this season, with two (Abbotsford and Seattle) going on to become full members in 1999.

Changes from the 1997 season

Name changes
 Puget Sound BigFoot changed name to Seattle BigFoot.

New teams
13 teams were added for the season, 9 expansion teams and four associates from the Pacific Coast Soccer League.

Teams leaving
The Cincinnati Riverhawks were promoted to the A-League and the Miami Breakers were promoted to the D3 Pro League following the 1997 season.

7 teams folded after the 1997 season:
 Bellingham Orcas
 Chattanooga Express
 Lincoln Brigade
 Michigan Madness
 Omaha Flames (team folded early in 1998 season, division games were rescheduled)
 Southwest Florida Manatees
 West Florida Fury

The Lexington Bluegrass Bandits and Tucson Amigos went on hiatus for this year.

Standings

Central Division

Great Lakes Division

Northwest Division

Southeast Division

Southwest Division

Playoffs

Format
Kalamazoo hosted the Finals and received a bye to the National Semi-Finals.
The top four teams from the Central, Great Lakes, Southeast, and Southwest divisions, however, if Kalamazoo places in the top four in the Central Division, the fifth place team will take their spot.  The top two teams in the Northwest Division will play the top two associate teams from the PCSL.  The team with the most points to lose in the Divisional rounds will play in the Regional round as a wild card against the Divisional champion with the most points.  The remaining four teams will play each other based on geography.

Divisional brackets

Regional finals

PDSL finals bracket

References

1998
4
1998 in Canadian soccer